David Earle (born 1939) is a Canadian choreographer, dancer and artistic director. In 1968 Earle was co-founder and co-artistic director of Toronto Dance Theatre alongside Patricia Beatty and Peter Randazzo, where Earle choreographed new modern dance pieces. In 1996 Earle started his own company called Dancetheatre David Earle where he continues to choreograph new works, to teach, and to create with the next generation of modern dancers. David Earle has received many accolades; a member of the Order of Canada,  a recipient of the Jean A. Chalmers Award for Distinction in Choreography, also an honorary doctorate degree from Queen’s University in Kingston, Ontario.

Early life and training
David Earle grew up in the suburb of Etobicoke. Earle's dance training began at the age of five with ballet and tap lessons from Toronto teachers Beth Weyms and Fanny Birdsall, debuting at Eaton Auditorium. In 1947, he joined Dorothy Goulding's Toronto Children's Players, where we would act for eleven years.

After graduating High School at Etobicoke Collegiate Institute, David Earle studied Radio and Television Arts for two years at Toronto's Ryerson Polytechnical Institute. At the age of twenty he left Ryerson after a Bolshoi Ballet performance inspired him to dance; he auditioned and was accepted as a scholarship student at Canada's National Ballet School.  There he would meet Eurhythmics teacher Donald Himes who introduced him to the Laban technique at, modern dance artist, Yoné Kvietys' studio. David would go on to perform for two years with Kvietys' company.

In New York David Earle studied with Martha Graham. He was a dancer with the José Limón Dance Company for a single season, then assisted with setting up the London Contemporary Dance Theatre in England.

Toronto Dance Theatre
After returning to Toronto Earle co-founded Toronto Dance Theatre with Patricia Beatty and Peter Randazzo in 1968. They agreed to share the role of artistic director and each create choreography for the company. Earle became known for emotional theatricality and attractive ensemble pieces. As time passed Earle assumed a more dominant role in the affairs and choreography of the company.

Earle joined the founders in 1977 to buy St. Enoch’s Church to convert it to the Winchester Street Theatre. In 1979 Earle created the School of Toronto Dance Theatre, a training program for professional modern dancers.

One of Earle’s dances during this time was Miserere, originally part of a larger work called Exit, Nightfall (1981). The piece incorporates liturgical themes  and other religious imagery.

Earle and the other founders offered the artistic directorship of the company to Kenny Pearl in 1983.

During this time, Earle continued to choreograph in various places across Canada. In 1984 he created Sacra Conversazione at the Banff School of Fine Arts. The piece touches on themes of mortality and grief and is danced to Mozart’s unfinished Requiem Mass. The piece was later remounted with Toronto Dance Theatre in 1986.

In 1987 Earle returned as Toronto Dance Theatre’s sole artistic director. He continued in this role until 1994, where he became artist-in-residence with the company for two years.

He was profiled in Moze Mossanen's 1987 documentary film Dance for Modern Times, alongside Christopher House, James Kudelka, Ginette Laurin and Danny Grossman.

Dancetheatre David Earle
After leaving Toronto Dance Theatre in 1996 Earle  founded a new dance company called Dancetheatre David Earle, in Guelph, Ontario, Canada. His recent work features collaborations with choirs, orchestras and chamber choirs.

In 2014 Earle premiered Exile, performed by three dancers. The piece drew upon traditional modern dance and was danced by young artists.

Choreography 

David Earle has choreographed more than 130 works over five decades as founder/artistic director of Dancetheatre David Earle and co-founder/co-artistic director of Toronto Dance Theatre.

Accolades 
 2012 - Queen’s Diamond Jubilee Medal
 2011 - Premier’s Award for Excellence in the Arts, Laureate
 2009 - Premier’s Award for Excellence in the Arts, Individual Category
 2006 - Walter Carsen Prize for excellence in the performing arts
 2005 - Honorary Doctorate of Laws, Queen's University, Kingston, Ontario
 2002 - Jacqueline Lemieux Prize, Canada Council for the Arts
 1998 - Muriel Sherrin Award, Toronto Arts Council Foundation 
 1996 - The Order of Canada 
 1994 - Jean A. Chalmers Award for Distinction in Choreography.
 1988 - Toronto Arts Award for Performing Arts - Toronto Dance Theatre co-founders David Earle, Patricia Beatty and Peter Randazzo.
 1987 - Clifford E. Lee Award from the Banff Centre for the Arts 
 1987 -  Dora Mavor Moore Award for best new choreography for Sunrise.
 "[ David Earle's ]... work Sacra Conversazione has been selected by Canadian dance professionals as one of ten Canadian choreographic masterworks of the twentieth century."

References

External links 

 Dancetheatre David Earle - Official Website

1939 births
Modern dance
Modern dancers
Living people
Canadian choreographers
Members of the Order of Canada
People from Toronto